Rhytidostemma is a genus of flowering plants belonging to the family Apocynaceae.

Its native range is Panama to Southern Tropical America.

Species:

Rhytidostemma badilloi 
Rhytidostemma floresii 
Rhytidostemma fontellanum 
Rhytidostemma hoffmanii 
Rhytidostemma laurae 
Rhytidostemma peruvianum 
Rhytidostemma surinamense 
Rhytidostemma viride

References

Apocynaceae
Apocynaceae genera